David Heath (born 1959) is an American investigative journalist and author of "Longshot: The Inside Story of the Race for a COVID-19 Vaccine."
He was a Senior Reporter at The Center for Public Integrity.
He won the 2002 Goldsmith Prize for Investigative Reporting, with Duff Wilson, the 2001 George Polk Award, and two Gerald Loeb Awards: Large Newspapers in 2002 for "Uninformed Consent", and an Honorable Mention for Medium Newspapers in 2006 for "Selling Drug Secrets".

Life
He graduated from Grinnell College, in 1981. 
He was a reporter at the Enid, Oklahoma News & Eagle, and the Fort Wayne News-Sentinel.
He was a reporter for the Louisville Courier-Journal.
He was an investigative reporter for The Seattle Times.
In 2002, he was visiting writer at Grinnell College.
He was a 2006 Harvard Nieman Fellow.

Family
He is married.

References

External links
Reporter's blog
www.anderson.ucla.edu

American male journalists
Gerald Loeb Award winners for Small and Medium Newspapers
Grinnell College alumni
George Polk Award recipients
1959 births
Living people
Writers from Enid, Oklahoma
Gerald Loeb Award winners for Large Newspapers